Simon Frank Garfield (born 19 March 1960) is a British journalist and non-fiction author.

Biography
Garfield was born in London in 1960. He was educated at the independent University College School in Hampstead, London, and the London School of Economics, where he was executive editor of The Beaver. He won the Guardian/NUS 'Student Journalist of the Year' award in 1981, and the same year he became a sub-editor at the Radio Times. He wrote scripts for BBC radio documentaries in the early 1980s. He also wrote for Time Out magazine, acting as editor from 1988 to 1989. He has written for newspapers such as The Independent, The Independent on Sunday, and The Observer, and was named Mind Journalist of the Year in 2005. He was among the clients of Pat Kavanagh at United Agents.

He is the author of several books including Expensive Habits: The Dark Side of the Industry, the Somerset Maugham Prize-winning The End of Innocence: Britain in the Time of AIDS, The Wrestling, The Nation's Favourite: The True Adventures of Radio 1, and Mauve.

In 2010 his book Just My Type was published, exploring the history of typographic fonts.

Garfield appeared on 25 February 2013 episode of The Colbert Report to discuss why he wrote On the Map.

Garfield's book To the Letter: A Curious History of Correspondence is one of the inspirations behind the charity event Letters Live.

Bibliography

Books

 Money for Nothing: Greed and Exploitation in the Music Industry (1986)
 The End of Innocence: Britain in the Time of AIDS (1994)
 The Wrestling (1996)
 The Nation's Favourite: The True Adventures of Radio One (1998) – (account of turmoil at BBC radio station)
 Mauve: How One Man Invented a Color That Changed the World (2000) – (Victorian chemist William Perkin and his development of synthetic dyes), W. W. Norton & Company, 
 The Last Journey of William Huskisson (2002) – (pioneering development of steam railways in Britain)
 Our Hidden Lives: The Everyday Diaries of a Forgotten Britain (2004) – (interwoven threads from five diaries from post-World War II Britain)
 We are at War: The Remarkable Diaries of Five Ordinary People (2005) – (interwoven accounts from five diaries from the period preceding World War II)
 Private Battles: Our Intimate Diaries – How the War Almost Defeated Us (2006) – (interwoven accounts from four diaries of ordinary Britains living through World War II)
 The Error World: An Affair With Stamps (2008) – (memoir of the author's stamp collecting obsession)
 The Wrestling – (British wrestling and its eccentric performers and fans)
 Exposure: The Unusual Life and Violent Death of Bob Carlos Clarke (2009) – (Irish photographer and suicide)
 Mini: The True and Secret History of the Making of a Motor Car (2009)
 Just My Type: A Book About Fonts (Profile Books Ltd, 2010)
 On the Map: Why the World Looks the Way it Does (Profile Books Ltd, 2012)
 To the Letter: A Curious History of Correspondence – A Celebration of the Lost Art of Letter Writing (Canongate, 2013)
 (as editor)  A Notable Woman: The Romantic Journals of Jean Lucey Pratt.  (Canongate, 2015)
 Timekeepers: How The World Became Obsessed With Time (Canongate, 2016)
 In Miniature: How Small Things Illuminate The World (Canongate, 2018)
 Dog's Best Friend: A Brief History of an Unbreakable Bond (Weidenfeld & Nicolson, 2020)
 All the Knowledge in the World : The Extraordinary History of the Encyclopaedia (Orion Publishing, 2022)

Critical studies, reviews and biography

References

External links
 
 
 Our Hidden Lives, 2005 film-page
 The Unfolding Story of Maps: Dragon Warnings to Smartphone Screens (Published 2012) Janet Maslin, The New York Times, 18 December 2012
 Video of Garfield's interview with Colbert

1960 births
Living people
English male journalists
English non-fiction writers
People educated at University College School
Rail transport writers
English male non-fiction writers
20th-century British journalists
20th-century British non-fiction writers
20th-century English male writers
21st-century British journalists
21st-century British non-fiction writers
21st-century English male writers
Journalists from London